This article summarizes the highlights of professional and amateur golf in the year 2010.

Men's professional golf
Major championships
8–11 April: The Masters - American Phil Mickelson defeated Englishman Lee Westwood by three strokes. The event also marked Tiger Woods' return from a self-imposed absence after revelations of marital infidelity; he finished tied for fourth.
17–20 June: U.S. Open - Graeme McDowell of Northern Ireland won by one stroke over France's Grégory Havret and became the first European to win the U.S. Open since 1970.
15–18 July: The Open Championship - Louis Oosthuizen from South Africa won by seven strokes over Lee Westwood.
12–15 August: PGA Championship - Martin Kaymer of Germany defeated American Bubba Watson in a three-hole playoff. Another American, Dustin Johnson, missed out on the playoff when he was ruled to have grounded his club in an unmapped bunker on the 72nd hole, incurring a two-stroke penalty.

World Golf Championships 
18–21 February: WGC-Accenture Match Play Championship - Ian Poulter defeated fellow Englishman Paul Casey 4&2.
11–14 March WGC-CA Championship - Ernie Els of South Africa won his second WGC event.
5–8 August: WGC-Bridgestone Invitational - American Hunter Mahan won his first WGC event.
4–7 November: WGC-HSBC Champions - Francesco Molinari of Italy won his first WGC event.

FedEx Cup playoff events - see 2010 FedEx Cup Playoffs
26–29 August: The Barclays - American Matt Kuchar defeated Scotsman Martin Laird on the first playoff hole.
3–6 September: Deutsche Bank Championship - American Charley Hoffman shot a final-round 62 to secure a five-shot win.
9–12 September: BMW Championship - Dustin Johnson won by one shot over Paul Casey. In other news, Tiger Woods and Vijay Singh, who combined to win the previous three FedEx Cup titles, failed to qualify for The Tour Championship.
23–26 September: The Tour Championship - American Jim Furyk won by one shot over Englishman Luke Donald. The victory gave Furyk the FedEx Cup and its $10 million prize.

Other leading PGA Tour events 
6–9 May: The Players Championship - South African Tim Clark, who had previously more money than anyone else on the PGA Tour without ever winning a tournament, took the championship by one shot over Australian Robert Allenby. Prior to his victory, Clark had played in 206 PGA Tour events without ever winning.
 19–22 August: Wyndham Championship – In the final event before the FedEx Cup playoffs, Arjun Atwal made history by becoming the first Indian-born player ever to win on the PGA Tour, as well as the first Monday qualifier to win on tour since 1986.

For a complete list of PGA Tour results see 2010 PGA Tour.

Other leading European Tour events
20–23 May: BMW PGA Championship - Englishman Simon Khan won by one stroke over Fredrik Andersson Hed and Luke Donald.
25–28 November: Dubai World Championship - Robert Karlsson from Sweden defeated Ian Poulter in a play-off.

For a complete list of European Tour results see 2010 European Tour.

Team events
1–4 October: Ryder Cup - Europe win 14½-13½ after an unprecedented Monday finish following a weather affected tournament at Celtic Manor.

Tour leaders
PGA Tour -  Matt Kuchar (US$4,910,477)
 This total does not include FedEx Cup bonuses.
European Tour -  Martin Kaymer (€4,461,011)
 This total includes the bonus of US$1.5 million (€1,092,418) earned for winning the Race to Dubai.
Japan Golf Tour  -   Kim Kyung-tae (¥181,103,799)
Asian Tour -  Noh Seung-yul (US$822,361.03)
PGA Tour of Australasia -  Geoff Ogilvy (A$459,900.00)
Sunshine Tour -  Charl Schwartzel (R5,097,913.58)
OneAsia Tour -  Liang Wenchong (US$560,736.57)

Awards
PGA Tour
FedEx Cup –  Jim Furyk
PGA Player of the Year -  Jim Furyk
Player of the Year (Jack Nicklaus Trophy) -  Jim Furyk
Leading money winner (Arnold Palmer Award) -  Matt Kuchar
Vardon Trophy -  Matt Kuchar
Byron Nelson Award -  Matt Kuchar
Rookie of the Year -  Rickie Fowler
Comeback Player of the Year -  Stuart Appleby
Payne Stewart Award -  Tom Lehman
European Tour
Golfer of the Year -  Martin Kaymer and  Graeme McDowell
Rookie of the Year -  Matteo Manassero
Nationwide Tour
Player of the Year -  Jamie Lovemark

Other tour results
 2010 Asian Tour
 2010 PGA Tour of Australasia
 2010 Canadian Tour
 2010 Challenge Tour
 2010 Japan Golf Tour
 2010 Nationwide Tour
 2010 OneAsia Tour
 2010 Sunshine Tour
 2010 Tour de las Américas

Other happenings
 15 March – The International Federation of PGA Tours announced that the Mission Hills World Cup will change from an annual event to a biennial event. It will not be played in 2010 and will resume in 2011, to be played in odd-numbered years thereafter. While the event will continue to be held in China, its venue will change from the Mission Hills Golf Club in Shenzhen to Mission Hills Haikou in the island province of Hainan.
 2 May – In the final round of The Crowns, an event on the Japan Golf Tour, Ryo Ishikawa becomes the first golfer ever to shoot 58 on a major professional tour.
 1 November – The five-year reign of Tiger Woods in the Official World Golf Rankings ends, with England's Lee Westwood taking over the top spot.
 5 December - Korean Kim Kyung-tae became the first golfer with non-Japanese origin to top the money list in Japan Golf Tour.

Women's professional golf
LPGA majors
1–4 April: Kraft Nabisco Championship - Taiwan's Yani Tseng won her second career major and third LPGA Tour title, edging out Norwegian Suzann Pettersen by one shot.
24–27 June: LPGA Championship - American Cristie Kerr won her second career major, coming in at 19 strokes under par, 12 strokes ahead of second-place Song-Hee Kim. With that record-setting margin of victory, Kerr became the first American to be ranked the top woman golfer in the world since rankings began in 2006.
8–11 July: U.S. Women's Open - American Paula Creamer was the only player to finish under par in a four-stroke victory, her ninth on the LPGA Tour and her first career major win.
29 July-1 August: Ricoh Women's British Open - 21-year-old Yani Tseng won her second major of the year and the third of her career by one shot over Australian Katherine Hull.

Ladies European Tour major (in addition to the Women's British Open)
22–25 July: Evian Masters - Korean Jiyai Shin won her seventh career LPGA Tour title by one shot and reclaimed the top spot in the world rankings from Japan's Ai Miyazato.

For a complete list of Ladies European Tour results see Ladies European Tour.

Additional LPGA Tour events 
2–5 December: LPGA Tour Championship - Swede Maria Hjorth won her fourth career LPGA Tour title by one shot.

For a complete list of LPGA Tour results see 2010 LPGA Tour.

Money list leaders
LPGA Tour –  Na Yeon Choi ($1,871,166)
LPGA of Japan Tour -  Ahn Sun-ju (¥145,073,799)
Ladies European Tour –  Lee-Anne Pace (€339,517.77)
LPGA of Korea Tour -  Lee Bo-mee (₩557,376,856)
Ladies Asian Golf Tour -  Lee-Anne Pace ($88,330)
ALPG Tour -  Karrie Webb (A$132,000) (2009/2010 season)
Duramed Futures Tour -  Cindy LaCrosse ($94,578)

Awards
LPGA Tour Player of the Year –  Yani Tseng
LPGA Tour Rookie of the Year –  Azahara Muñoz
LPGA Tour Vare Trophy –  Na Yeon Choi
LET Player of the Year –  Lee-Anne Pace
LET Rookie of the Year –  In-Kyung Kim

Other happenings
 23 April – Lorena Ochoa, the world's top-ranked player, announced her retirement. The 28-year-old Ochoa, with two majors and 25 other LPGA tour wins, indicated that she wanted to raise a family and work with her charitable foundation. Her last regular event was the Tres Marias Championship, although she also said she would play in the Lorena Ochoa Invitational, the tournament she hosts, in November in her hometown of Guadalajara.
 2 May – Jiyai Shin claimed the World Number One Ranking, surpassing Lorena Ochoa who had held the position for the previous 158 weeks. Shin's ascension came after she won the Cyber Agent Ladies event on the Japan LPGA Tour. It was her seventh victory worldwide in the previous two years, including three wins on the LPGA Tour. Ochoa, playing in her last LPGA tournament before her announced retirement would have had to finish in fourth place or higher to retain the Number One position; she finished sixth.
 9 May – The body of 25-year-old LPGA player and former University of Arizona standout Erica Blasberg was found in her Henderson, Nevada home with a plastic bag over her head. On 24 August, the Clark County Coroner ruled her death a suicide. The primary cause of death was asphyxia, with toxic levels of several prescription drugs a contributing factor.
 20 June – Jennifer Song, the current U.S. Women's Amateur Public Links and U.S. Women's Amateur Golf champion, won her first tournament as a professional, the Futures Tour major Tate & Lyle Players Championship.
 21 June – Ai Miyazato took over the number 1 position in the Women's World Golf Rankings, succeeding Jiyai Shin who had held the title for the previous seven weeks. Miyazato won four of the first nine official LPGA tournaments in 2010.
 28 June - Cristie Kerr took over the number 1 position in the Women's World Golf Rankings after winning the LPGA Championship by 12 strokes.  She became the first American to hold the top spot since rankings began in 2006.
 19 July - Miyazato reclaimed the number 1 position in the Women's World Golf Rankings.
 26 July - Shin took back the number 1 position in the Women's World Golf Rankings after her win in the Evian Masters.
 16 August - Kerr reclaimed the number 1 position in the Women's World Golf Rankings.
 23 August – Miyazato returned to number 1 in the Women's World Golf Rankings after winning the Safeway Classic.
 25 October - Kerr again regained her number 1 position in the Women's World Golf Rankings after Sime Darby LPGA Malaysia.
 1 November - Shin took back her number 1 position in the Women's World Golf Rankings after LPGA Hana Bank Championship.
 21 November - Korean Ahn Sun-ju clinched the season money leader in LPGA of Japan Tour regardless of the outcome of the last remaining tournament, the Japan LPGA Tour Championship Ricoh Cup. She is the only non-Japanese golfer to be the season money leader after Taiwanese Ai-Yu Tu in 1991.

Senior men's professional golf
Senior majors
27–30 May: Senior PGA Championship - American Tom Lehman won his first senior major on the first hole of a sudden-death playoff over fellow American Fred Couples and South African David Frost.
22–25 July: Senior British Open - Bernhard Langer of Germany won his first senior major by one shot over American Corey Pavin.
29 July-1 August: U.S. Senior Open - Langer won his second senior major in as many weeks by three shots over Couples.
19–22 August: JELD-WEN Tradition - American Fred Funk won his second Tradition and third senior major by one shot over fellow American Michael Allen and Taiwan's Lu Chien-soon.
7–10 October: Senior Players Championship - American Mark O'Meara won his first senior major on the first hole of a sudden-death playoff over Michael Allen.

Full results
2010 Champions Tour
2010 European Senior Tour

Money list leaders
Champions Tour - German Bernhard Langer topped the money list for the third straight year with earnings of $2,648,939.
European Senior Tour - Thailand's Boonchu Ruangkit topped the Order of Merit with earnings of €266,609.

Awards
Champions Tour
Charles Schwab Cup –  Bernhard Langer
Player of the Year -  Bernhard Langer
Rookie of the Year -  Fred Couples
Comeback Player of the Year -  Ken Green
Leading money winner (Arnold Palmer Award) -  Bernhard Langer ($2,648,939)
Lowest stroke average (Byron Nelson Award) -  Fred Couples (67.96)

Amateur golf
18–21 May: NCAA Division I Women's Golf Championships - Purdue won its first team championship. Caroline Hedwall of Oklahoma State won the individual title.
1–6 June: NCAA Division I Men's Golf Championships - Augusta State won its first team championship. Scott Langley of Illinois won the individual title.
11–13 June: Curtis Cup - The United States claimed its seventh consecutive Cup, defeating the team from Great Britain & Ireland by a score of 12½ to 7½.
14–19 June: The Amateur Championship - South Korea's Jin Jeong became the first Asian player to win the Championship in the competition's 125-year history.
9–15 August: U.S. Women's Amateur - In a matchup of 17-year-old Americans, Danielle Kang defeated Jessica Korda, the daughter of former Czech tennis star Petr Korda, 2 & 1 in the 36-hole final.
23–29 August: U.S. Amateur - Oklahoma State University student Peter Uihlein beat David Chung in the final match 4&2 to win the Havemeyer Trophy.
20–23 October Espirito Santo Trophy - South Korea won by 17 strokes over the United States.
28–31 October Eisenhower Trophy - France won by four strokes over Denmark.

World Golf Hall of Fame inductees
The Hall inducted no class in 2010. On 22 July, it announced that it would move future induction ceremonies to May, on the Monday before The Players Championship. The next class would be inducted on 9 May 2011.

Table of results
This table summarizes all the results referred to above in date order. 

The following biennial events will next be played in 2011: Solheim Cup, Presidents Cup, Seve Trophy, Mission Hills World Cup, Walker Cup.

References

 
Golf by year